Francesco Spera, O.F.M. (died 1587) was a Roman Catholic prelate who served as Titular Archbishop of Nazareth (1587).

Biography
Francesco Spera was ordained a priest in the Order of Friars Minor.
On 11 May 1587, he was appointed during the papacy of Pope Sixtus V as Titular Archbishop of Nazareth.
On 24 May 1587, he was consecrated bishop by Decio Azzolini (seniore), Bishop of Cervia, with Francesco Carusi, Bishop of Valva e Sulmona, and Franciscus Panicarola, Titular Bishop of Chrysopolis in Arabia, serving as co-consecrators. 
He served as Titular Archbishop of Nazareth until his death on 28 October 1587.

References

External links and additional sources
 (for Chronology of Bishops) 
 (for Chronology of Bishops)  

16th-century Roman Catholic titular bishops
Bishops appointed by Pope Sixtus V
1587 deaths